The Bottineau LRT (Metro Blue Line Extension) is a proposed light rail line extension in the Minneapolis – Saint Paul Metro area, projected to run northwest from Target Field station in downtown Minneapolis along County Road 81 to Brooklyn Park.

The selected alignment was initially planned to run adjacent to a BNSF freight line, but opposition from the company has forced the project to be redesigned with a new routing.

Alignment alternatives 
The Bottineau Transitway Alternative Analysis Study, released in 2009, outlined several different alternatives for both the northern and southern ends of the corridor. In 2010, the final AA report recommended the A-D1 light rail alignment as the best option, but also suggested B-D1, A-D2 and B-D2 should continue to be studied. A-D1 and B-D1 were also recommended for continued study as possible bus rapid transit alignments.

Northern alternatives
There are two northern alternatives:

Alternative A begins in Maple Grove and runs along Arbor Lakes Parkway and 77th Avenue from Hemlock Lane to the railroad tracks of BNSF Railway's Monticello Subdivision. The potential stations were Hemlock Lane, Zachary Lane, Boone Avenue and 71st Avenue.

Alternative B begins in Brooklyn Park near Target North Corporate Campus and runs south along West Broadway to the BNSF railroad tracks. The potential stations are 97th Avenue, 93rd Avenue, 85th Avenue and Brooklyn Boulevard. 71st Avenue Station, though it would run along this alignment's right-of-way, would not be built if this alternative were selected.

Middle segment
Through the middle portion of the corridor, the study has selected a single alternative. This alternative follows 8 miles of BNSF right-of-way, paralleling County Road 81, from Interstate 694 to 36th Avenue. The proposed stations are 63rd Avenue, Bass Lake Road and Robbinsdale Transit Center. This alignment is known as Alternative C.

Southern alternatives
The southern part of the corridor has four potential alignments. Three could be used for light rail or bus rapid transit and one would be strictly for bus rapid transit. Every alternative would still terminate at Target Field station.

Alternative D1 would continue to follow the BNSF right of way south to Olson Memorial Highway (Minnesota State Highway 55) and would follow Olson Memorial Highway into downtown. Stations would be located at Theodore Wirth Park, Golden Valley Road, Penn Avenue and Van White Boulevard.

Alternative D2 would run entirely along streets, instead of partially along railroad right-of-way. It would follow West Broadway to Penn Avenue and Penn Avenue to Olson Memorial Highway into downtown. Stations would be located at North Memorial Medical Center, West Broadway at Penn Ave, Penn Ave at Plymouth Ave and Olson Memorial Highway at Van White Boulevard.

Two additional alternatives, D3 and D4, were essentially eliminated in the 2010 report.

Transit mode
The Northwest Corridor was proposed as a Tier I transitway, for rapid development, in the Metropolitan Council's 2030 Transportation Policy Plan published in 2004. In a region with no operational light rail lines, ridership numbers appeared too low to justify the expense of light rail in this corridor. The line was fast-tracked for development into a busway and much of the work was completed to receive federal funding for construction of a busway.

Though this corridor was advanced by the Metropolitan Council for development as a busway, the success of the Blue Line and lobbying by Hennepin County commissioner Mike Opat forced the mode choice to be re-evaluated. In March 2007, the Bottineau Partnership resolved to conduct an alternatives analysis rather than simply building the busway. Hennepin County commissioned a full Alternatives Analysis, to be completed by mid-2009.

The recent creation of the Counties Transit Improvement Board, which controls a new dedicated transit tax for the Twin Cities region, has created a strong new push for light rail corridor development. According to the legislation enacting the Counties Transit Improvement Board, in order for a project to receive CTIB funding, it must be part of the Metropolitan Council's long-term transit plan; new planning documents released April 11, 2008, by the Metropolitan Council indicate that the Bottineau Corridor is a strong prospect for LRT, with numbers supporting LRT development. Ridership predictions for the corridor, though lower than those for either the Central or Southwest corridors, are much higher than estimates before the opening of the Blue Line.

Alignment alternatives study results 
The alternative analysis study concluded that the best alignment for the Bottineau Corridor would be light rail transit service using Alternatives B, C and D1. The line scored well overall for the three categories of Corridor Benefits, Development Opportunities and Environmental Impacts. The Cost/Benefit Analysis pushed this corridor to the highest position of the potential corridors. This corridor would serve an estimated 27,000 daily riders by 2030. It would take 29 minutes to travel from Brooklyn Park to downtown Minneapolis, a few minutes more than the express bus service. The construction cost estimate for the corridor is $1 billion, in 2017 dollars. Though bus rapid transit would have cost significantly less, estimated at $560 million, it is also estimated that there would have been only 19,900 daily riders.

Design 
In August 2014, the Metropolitan Council received federal approval to enter the design phase for the Bottineau LRT, with service expected to begin in 2021. The $997 million light rail extension would be 50% funded by the Federal Transit Administration, 30% by the Counties Transit Improvement Board, 10% by Hennepin County and 10% by the state of Minnesota. Kimley-Horn was awarded an engineering contract worth up to $110 million in September 2014.

By 2019, the line was expected to start construction in 2020 and start service in 2024.

Opposition, realignment
For  of the original  route, light rail trains would have run parallel to the freight rail tracks of BNSF's Monticello Subdivision. The Federal Transit Administration required the Metropolitan Council to have approval from BNSF Railway before moving forward with the grant process and construction. Spokesperson Amy McBeth from BNSF Railway stated "We don’t want to leave anyone with the impression we are negotiating. We are not," and "We’ve told Met Council repeatedly for the past several years and as recently as this spring that we are not proceeding with any discussion of passenger rail on our property in this corridor." On July 29, 2020, BNSF reiterated its longstanding stance. "We are a freight railroad that moves the goods that we all use every day; we provide a vital service, particularly in these unprecedented times. The proposed Blue Line light rail project does not meet our high standards." On August 3, 2020, the Metropolitan Council announced they would begin to "explore opportunities to advance this critical project without using BNSF Railway right of way."

On March 11, 2021, the Metropolitan Council and Hennepin County released revised potential route options for the proposed Blue Line Extension. The proposed new routes retain the northern part of the original alignment and still terminate at Target Field in downtown Minneapolis. However, they offer several different paths through north Minneapolis, and (unlike the original plan) all bypass the suburb of Golden Valley. They avoid the BNSF right-of-way by using Bottineau Boulevard. At the south end of the extension, the routes use various combinations of surface streets, including Broadway Avenue, Lowry Avenue, and Washington Avenue.

Current plans call for the Blue Line Extension to run west from Target Field to Lyndale Avenue, then through north Minneapolis via Lyndale Avenue, West Broadway Avenue, and Bottineau Boulevard, until it meets the originally planned route near 73rd Avenue and West Broadway.

References

External links 

Bottineau Partnership
Metropolitan Council project website
Bottineau LRT community works
Alignment alternatives map

Transportation in Minneapolis
Proposed railway lines in Minnesota
Metro Transit (Minnesota)